The 2020 Lunar New Year Cup, was an annual football event to be held in Hong Kong to celebrate Chinese New Year. The event was organized by the Hong Kong Football Association. 2 matches were to be played.

However, on 23 January 2020, three days before the event, the HKFA announced its cancellation due to the COVID-19 pandemic.

Teams
All teams were to have come from Hong Kong this year.

First match (90 minutes): 
 Hong Kong Women's Representative Team
 Stars of Future

Second match (90 minutes): 
 Hong Kong Representative Team
 Hong Kong Premier League XI

Squads

Hong Kong Women's Representative Team
 Team Manager: Betty Wong
 Head coach:  Ricardo
 Coach: Wong Chi Wai, Wong Shuk Fan, Fan Chun Kit
 Goalkeeper coach: Poon Kwong Tak

Stars of Future
 Team Manager: Betty Wong
 Head coach: Chan Shuk Chi
 Coach: Fan Ying Ying, Ng Wing Kum
 Goalkeeper coach: Wong Tsz Him
 Conditioning coach:  Matthew Pears

Hong Kong Representative Team
 Head coach: Cheung Kin Fung
 Coach: Yu Siu Chee, Fan Chun Yip,  Matthew Pears

Hong Kong Premier League XI
 Head coach: Liu Chun Fai 
 Coach: Anílton, Chan Ka Ki

Results

First match

Second match

References

Lunar New Year Cup
Lunar New Year Cup
Lunar New Year Cup